Shanghai Livingston American School is an international school in Shanghai, China. In 2015, it was the 10th most expensive school in Shanghai with an annual fees of RMB 169,000 ($26,600).

History
In 2001 former American Congressman from Louisiana Bob Livingston seeking to gain permission to establish schools in the five cities where the United States has US Consulate which would provide an American style education, was given permission to establish a school in Shanghai.

Curriculum
LAS offers a comprehensive, projects-intensive curriculum based on the California standards. Each school division utilizes teaching methods and theory culled from leading experts in the fields of education, psychology, and social science.

See also
Americans in China

References

External links
Shanghai Livingston American School

American international schools in China
Educational institutions established in 2001
International schools in Shanghai
2001 establishments in China
American expatriates in China